Jeong Yong-ki (born 1970) is a South Korean film director and scriptwriter.

Filmography
As director:
 Marrying the Mafia 5: Return of the Family (2012)
 Couples (2011)
 The Righteous Thief (2009)
 Once Upon a Time (2008)
 Marrying the Mafia III (2006)
 Marrying the Mafia II (2005)
 The Doll Master (2004)

External links
 
 
 

South Korean film directors
South Korean screenwriters
1970 births
Living people
Hanyang University alumni
People from Seoul